Pucov may refer to places:

Pucov (Třebíč District), Czech Republic
Pucov, Dolný Kubín District, Slovakia